This Is the Life may refer to:

Music

Albums 
 This Is the Life (Amy Macdonald album), or the title song (see below), 2007
 This Is the Life (Duane Steele album), or the title song, 1997
 This Is the Life (Farmer's Daughter album), or the title song, 1998
 This Is the Life (Lulu Dikana album), or the title song, 2009
 This Is the Life (Ricky Ross album), or the title song, 2002
 This Is the Life!, by Norm Lewis, 2008

Songs 
 "This Is the Life" (Amy Macdonald song)
 "This Is the Life" (Hannah Montana song), by Miley Cyrus, performing as Hannah Montana
 "This Is the Life" by "Weird Al" Yankovic from Dare to Be Stupid
 "This Is the Life", by The Dismemberment Plan from The Dismemberment Plan Is Terrified
 "This Is the Life", by Dream Theater from A Dramatic Turn of Events
 "This Is the Life", by E-40 from The Block Brochure: Welcome to the Soil 2
 "This Is the Life", by Irving Berlin
 "This Is the Life", by Jim Jones from Pray IV Reign
 "This Is the Life", by Living Colour from Time's Up
 "This Is the Life", by the Outlawz from Novakane
 "This Is the Life", by Rick Ross from Trilla
 "This Is the Life", by Two Door Cinema Club from Tourist History
 "This Is the Life", from the musical Golden Boy
 "This Is the Life", from the musical Love Life

Television and film 
 This Is the Life (TV series), an American Christian television dramatic anthology series
 This Is the Life (1933 film), a film directed by Albert de Courville
 This Is the Life (1935 film), a musical starring Jane Withers
 This Is the Life (1944 film), a film starring Donald O'Connor
 This Is the Life (2008 film), a documentary about the Good Life Cafe hip hop scene

Literature 
 This Is the Life!, 1926 autobiography by cartoonist Walt McDougall
 This Is the Life, 1991 novel by Joseph O'Neill

See also
 "Is This the Life", a 1988 song by Cardiacs